Happy Christmas Volume 4 is the fourth album in the Happy Christmas series started by BEC Records in 1998. It was released on October 25, 2005. This is the first one released by Tooth & Nail, BEC's mother label.

Track listing

Awards

In 2006, the album was nominated for a Dove Award for Special Event Album of the Year at the 37th GMA Dove Awards.

References

2005 Christmas albums
Christmas albums by American artists
Happy Christmas albums
Record label compilation albums
2005 compilation albums